Arclid Green is a village in Cheshire, England.

References

Villages in Cheshire